Francette Razafindrakoto Harifanja is a Malagasy politician.  A member of the National Assembly of Madagascar, she was elected as a member of the Tiako I Madagasikara party; she represents the constituency of Beroroha.

References
Profile on National Assembly site

Year of birth missing (living people)
Living people
Members of the National Assembly (Madagascar)
Tiako I Madagasikara politicians
21st-century Malagasy women politicians
21st-century Malagasy politicians
Malagasy women in politics
Place of birth missing (living people)